The Last Green Valley National Heritage Corridor is a federally designated National Heritage Corridor in northeastern Connecticut and portions of Massachusetts. It has a rural character with rolling hills, farmland and classic New England scenery. This area was designated because it is one of the last remaining stretches of green in the Boston to Washington, D.C. heavily urbanized corridor. The valley also has the largest stretch of dark night sky in the Northeast megalopolis corridor. It contains some of the largest unbroken forests in Southern New England, in a region of Connecticut known as the Quiet Corner.

Geography
The corridor consists mostly of the Eastern New England Upland, transitioning to the coastal forests to the south and east. The rolling hills in the southern part of the Corridor become more rugged in the northern part of the corridor. The highest elevation is  Burley Hill in Union, CT.

The corridor has a high concentration of state parks, state forests and other reserves, such as the Yale-Myers Forest, Pachaug State Forest, and the Norcross Wildlife Sanctuary. Of the area's over 700,000 acres, over 77% is made up of forest and farms. The 35-town region is home to over 300,000 people. The Last Green Valley is half the size of Grand Canyon National Park and more than ten times that of Acadia National Park, New England's only national park.

The over 1,100 square miles of protected territory extend from the northernmost point of East Brookfield, Massachusetts to the southernmost point of Preston, Connecticut.

History
Beginning in the 1980s, developmental pressures pushed citizens into creating organizations to protect lands, especially farmland from development. A report in 1988 by the National Park Service outlined solutions and it led to the creation of the Quinebaug and Shetucket Rivers Valley National Heritage Corridor in 1994. It was expanded in 1999 to include several communities in Massachusetts. In December 2014, Congress passed a law officially renaming the area the Last Green Valley National Heritage Corridor.

 Boston Hollow
 Bigelow Hollow State Park
 Chelsea Harbor, historic downtown Norwich, Connecticut 
 Historic Norwichtown Green
 Leffingwell House Museum
 Pachaug-Great Meadow Swamp
 Uncas Leap Heritage Area, Norwich, Connecticut

Recreation
 Air Line State Park Trail
 Beaver Brook State Park, Windham, Connecticut
 Bigelow Hollow State Park, Union, Connecticut
 Brimfield State Forest, Brimfield, Massachusetts
 Buffumville Lake, Oxford, Massachusetts
 East Brimfield Lake, Sturbridge, Massachusetts
 James L. Goodwin State Forest, Hampton, Connecticut
 Hodges Village Dam, Oxford, Massachusetts
 Hopeville Pond State Park, Griswold, Connecticut
 Killingly Pond State Park, Killingly, Connecticut
 Mansfield Hollow Lake, Mansfield, Connecticut
 Mansfield Hollow State Park, Mansfield, Connecticut
 Mashamoquet Brook State Park, Abington, Connecticut
 Mohegan Park, Norwich, Connecticut 
 Mohegan State Forest, Scotland, Connecticut
 Mooween State Park, Lebanon, Connecticut
 Mountain Laurel Sanctuary, Union, Connecticut
 Natchaug State Forest, Eastford, Connecticut
 Nathan Hale State Forest, Coventry, Connecticut
 Nipmuck State Forest, Union, Connecticut
 Norcross Wildlife Sanctuary, Wales/Holland, Massachusetts
 Norwich (Chelsea) Harbor Water Trail, Norwich, Connecticut
 Old Furnace State Park, Killingly, Connecticut
 Pachaug State Forest, Sterling, Voluntown, Griswold and Plainfield, Connecticut
 Pomeroy State Park, Lebanon, Connecticut
 Quaddick State Park, Thompson, Connecticut
 Quinebaug Lake State Park, Killingly, Connecticut
 Ross Pond State Park, Killingly, Connecticut
 Streeter Point Recreation Area, Sturbridge, Massachusetts
 Yale-Myers Forest, Union, Connecticut
 Wells State Park, Sturbridge, Massachusetts
 West Thompson Lake, Thompson, Connecticut
 Westville Lake, Sturbridge, Massachusetts

References

External links
 Official site: The Last Green Valley, Inc
 Tourism site: The Last Green Valley Tourism

Geography of Hampden County, Massachusetts
Geography of New London County, Connecticut
Geography of Tolland County, Connecticut
Geography of Windham County, Connecticut
Geography of Worcester County, Massachusetts
Tourist attractions in Hampden County, Massachusetts
Tourist attractions in New London County, Connecticut
Tourist attractions in Tolland County, Connecticut
Tourist attractions in Windham County, Connecticut
Tourist attractions in Worcester County, Massachusetts
National Heritage Areas of the United States